The Alfred J. and Georgia A. Armstrong House is a historic house in Portland, Oregon, United States. A modest but elaborate Queen Anne house built in 1894, it is one of very few intact examples of its type remaining from the early years of development in the King neighborhood. Likely constructed by one of its original occupants, a skilled carpenter, it exhibits more defining Queen Anne characteristics than other nearby houses of the same period, including a tower and the large quantity of jigsawed ornamentation. It was entered on the National Register of Historic Places in 2002.

See also
 National Register of Historic Places listings in Northeast Portland, Oregon

References

External links
 
 

1894 establishments in Oregon
Houses completed in 1895
Houses on the National Register of Historic Places in Portland, Oregon
King, Portland, Oregon
Queen Anne architecture in Oregon